The Tir II (IPS 18) is an Iranian built small fast attack craft  torpedo boat featuring a low, flush hull to reduce its radar cross-section.  The radar is set on a retractable mast, with fixed 21" tubes inside the superstructure.  Engines exhaust at the waterline to reduce its IR signature.  Built by Iranian Maritime Industries (a subsidiary of the state-owned DIO company), the Bavar-class missile-armed boats are being acquired to replace the Tir-IIs.

Ten units are in service, believed to be manned by the IRGCN, not the regular Iranian navy.  In late 2006/early 2007 six of the sixteen vessels built were transferred to the Syrian Navy, and remain fully operational.

References

Fast patrol boat classes of the Navy of the Islamic Revolutionary Guard Corps
Naval ships of Syria
Ships built by Marine Industries Organization
Iran–Syria military relations